Sun Stone is an album by jazz pianist Roberto Magris recorded in Miami, released on the JMood label in 2019, and featuring performances by the Roberto Magris Sextet with Ira Sullivan, Mark Colby, Shareef Clayton, Jamie Ousley and Rodolfo Zuniga. Jazz Hot magazine rated the album as "indispensable".

Reception

The Jazz Journal review by Brian Morton awarded the album 3½ stars and simply states: "If your paradigm of jazz is themes-and-solos, then this one will be meat and drink. It’s another great set from Magris, who doesn't seem to put a foot wrong when JMood call him in." The All About Jazz review by Jerome Wilson awarded the album 3 ½ stars and simply states: "This particular group is steeped in the jazz traditions of the Fifties and Sixties, echoing McCoy Tyner, Art Blakey and Horace Silver at different points. It plays within the confines of familiar jazz territory, but with soul and power." The Chicago Jazz Magazine review by Hrayr Attarian simply states: "“Effervescent,” “sophisticated,” and “stimulating” are three adjectives that immediately come to mind when asked to describe pianist Roberto Magris’ Sun Stone."

Track listing

 Sun Stone (Roberto Magris) - 9:34 
 Innamorati a Milano (Memo Remigi) - 9:23 
 Planet of Love (Roberto Magris) - 7:56 
 Maliblues (Roberto Magris) - 11:00 
 Beauty is Forever! (Roberto Magris) - 7:45 
 Look at the Stars (Roberto Magris) - 11:24 
 Sun Stone II (Roberto Magris) - 9:31

Personnel

Musicians
 Shareef Clayton - trumpet
 Ira Sullivan - alto sax, soprano sax, flute
 Mark Colby - tenor sax
Roberto Magris - piano
 Jamie Ousley - bass
 Rodolfo Zuniga - drums

Production
 Paul Collins – executive producer and co-producer
 Edward Blanco – co-producer
 Carlos Alvarez – engineering
Abe Goldstien – design
 Paul Collins and Nadja Debenjak – photography

References

2019 albums
Roberto Magris albums